Slovakia competed at the 2012 Winter Youth Olympics in Innsbruck, Austria. The Slovak team consisted of 30 athletes competing in 5 sports.

Medalists

Alpine skiing

Slovakia qualified two athletes.

Boys

Girls

Biathlon

Slovakia has qualified four athletes.

Boys

Girls

Mixed

Cross-country skiing

Slovakia qualified two athletes.

Boys

Girls

Sprint

Mixed

Ice hockey

Slovakia qualified a women's team.

Roster

 Viktoria Frankovicova
 Maria Hudecova
 Nikola Kaliska
 Romana Kiapesova
 Jana Kubalikova
 Zuzana Kubalikova
 Lubica Levcikova
 Katarina Luptakova
 Martina Matiskova
 Diana Papesova
 Maria Rajtarova
 Nikola Rezankova
 Lubica Stofankova
 Julia Svagerkova
 Dominika Takacova
 Miroslava Vavakova
 Silvia Vojtkova

Group A

 failed to qualify for the semifinals.

Luge

Slovakia qualified five athletes.

Boys

Girls

Team

See also
Slovakia at the 2012 Summer Olympics

References

2012 in Slovak sport
Nations at the 2012 Winter Youth Olympics
Slovakia at the Youth Olympics